The 2019–20 Bundesliga was the 57th season of the Bundesliga, Germany's premier football competition. It began on 16 August 2019 and concluded on 27 June 2020. Bayern Munich were the defending champions, and won their record-extending 8th consecutive title and 30th title overall (29th in the Bundesliga era) on 16 June with two games to spare. With 100 goals scored in 34 matches, Bayern became the second side to reach this milestone in a Bundesliga season, after the record 101 goals the club previously managed to score in 1971–72.

The number of substitutes allowed on the bench was increased from seven to nine for the 2019–20 season.

On 13 March 2020, the DFL suspended the Bundesliga and 2. Bundesliga due to the COVID-19 pandemic. After consultation with the German government, the league resumed behind closed doors on 16 May 2020. Due to the postponement, the final matchday on 27 June was the second latest date any Bundesliga season has concluded, after the 1971–72 season (which concluded a day later).

Effects of the COVID-19 pandemic
Due to the COVID-19 pandemic in Germany, on 8 March 2020 the Federal Minister of Health, Jens Spahn recommended cancelling events with more than 1,000 people. The following day, the DFL announced that the Bundesliga season would be completed to ensure planning for the following season, and that any postponements would be to matchdays en bloc. On 10 March, it was announced that the catch-up match between Borussia Mönchengladbach and 1. FC Köln on 11 March would be played behind closed doors, the first such occurrence in league history. All fixtures on matchday 26 (13–16 March) were planned to be played without spectators due to local restrictions on public gatherings, but the round was subsequently postponed on 13 March due to safety issues. On 16 March, the DFL General Assembly suspended the league until at least 2 April, and scheduled another meeting for the last week of March to discuss how the competition should proceed. The DFL General Assembly, at their meeting on 31 March, chose to extend the suspension until at least 30 April per the recommendation of the Executive Committee. At the meeting, the DFL established a sports medicine and special match operations task force responsible for examining a safe method to resume league play.

On 13 March 2020, Luca Kilian of SC Paderborn was the first Bundesliga player to test positive for COVID-19. By 21 March 2020, several clubs, including Eintracht Frankfurt and Hertha BSC, were under quarantine after multiple players and staff had tested positive, and training was made impossible for most others by curfews or the closure of facilities. The DFL looked into possible scenarios to finish the season regularly. However, several virologists raised doubts, stating that any professional football matches in Germany, including those behind closed doors, were unrealistic for at least the next 12 months. In his report for the 31 March DFL meeting, virologist Alexander Kekulé recommended to write off the current season. On 4 April 2020, he clarified that matches behind closed doors were possible in principle, but would require extensive measures, including a total of about 20,000 tests for COVID-19 for the players and staff (testing every player before the start of each game), and an extended quarantine for everyone involved. Kekulé was doubtful though that those measures could be justified at a time when tests for the general population were in short supply.

On 3 April 2020, the DFL reported that the financial situation of most teams was more serious than thought. Of the 36 professional football clubs in the Bundesliga and 2. Bundesliga, 13 would have to declare bankruptcy by May or June unless league operations resumed by then, including four teams from the Bundesliga. Twelve of those clubs had already used the outstanding license fees (which are dependent on the season to be continued) to pay their March debts to creditors. At their 31 March meeting, the DFL had decided that clubs that enter insolvency proceedings this season would not suffer the usual deduction of points, and clubs that enter proceedings next season only lose three instead of the usual nine points.

By 23 April 2020, the DFL had targeted 9 May as a possible resumption date for the Bundesliga. However, this goal suffered a setback when 1. FC Köln announced on 1 May that three people at the club tested positive, without showing any symptoms. This was done as part of a wave of 1,724 tests carried out involving personnel of the 36 Bundesliga and 2. Bundesliga clubs, in coordination with the Federal Ministry of Labour and Social Affairs, which resulted in seven further positive results in addition to those of Köln. After consultation with the German government, chancellor Angela Merkel and the leaders of the states of Germany approved the resumption of the leagues for the second half of May, with matches behind closed doors. The following day, the DFL confirmed that the Bundesliga would resume on 16 May, a Saturday, with matchday 26. The final matchday of the season (round 34), originally scheduled for 16 May, took place on 27 June, making it the second latest date any Bundesliga season has concluded. Only the 1971–72 season finished later (due to UEFA Euro 1972), concluding on 28 June.

The relegation play-offs between Werder Bremen, the 16th-placed team of the Bundesliga, and the 3rd-placed team of the 2. Bundesliga take place as planned. Per the competition regulations, clubs in the Bundesliga and 2. Bundesliga were required to compete in all matches following the restart, even if some players test positive, provided the team has enough healthy players available. On 14 May, after a meeting of all clubs, five substitutions were permitted, which has been temporarily allowed by IFAB following a proposal by FIFA to lessen the impact of fixture congestion. The broadcaster Sky Sport announced that for the first two weeks after the restart, the Bundesliga and 2. Bundesliga simulcast ("conference") would be shown on free-to-air television in Germany, in order to prevent gatherings of people without pay TV subscriptions.

Teams

A total of 18 teams participated in the 2019–20 edition of the Bundesliga.

Team changes

Following a victory against VfB Stuttgart on away goals in the relegation/promotion play-offs, Union Berlin were promoted to the Bundesliga for the first time in their history, becoming the 56th club to feature in the Bundesliga, and the first from the former East Berlin.

Stadiums and locations

Personnel and kits

Managerial changes

League table

Results

Relegation play-offs
All times are CEST (UTC+2).

Overview

|}

Matches

2–2 on aggregate. Werder Bremen won on away goals, and therefore both clubs remained in their respective leagues.

Statistics

Top scorers

Hat-tricks

4 Player scored four goals.

Clean sheets

Number of teams by state

Awards

Monthly awards

Annual awards

Notes

References

Bundesliga seasons
1
Germany
Bundesliga